Robert Eugene Ewing (born November 12, 1954) is an American politician and a Republican member of the South Dakota Senate representing District 31 since January 8, 2013.

Elections
2012 Ewing directly challenged incumbent Senate District 31 Republican Senator Tom Nelson in the June 5, 2012 Republican Primary and placed first with 1,602 votes (62%) against Senator Nelson; Ewing was unopposed for the November 6, 2012 General election, winning with 7,870 votes.

References

External links
Official page at the South Dakota Legislature
 

Place of birth missing (living people)
Living people
People from Spearfish, South Dakota
Republican Party South Dakota state senators
1954 births
21st-century American politicians